Afrasura dubitabilis is a moth of the  subfamily Arctiinae which is endemic to Nigeria.

References

External links

Moths described in 2009
Endemic fauna of Nigeria
Erebid moths of Africa
dubitabilis